The 1949 Washington Senators, the 49th season of the Major League Baseball franchise, won 50 games, lost 104, and finished in eighth and last place in the American League. It was the worst showing by the Washington club in 40 years, since the 1909 Senators lost 110 games. The team was managed by Joe Kuhel; it played its home games at Griffith Stadium, where it drew 770,745 fans, seventh in the circuit. 

The Senators actually won 25 of their first 45 games and stood in third place after Sunday, June 5, 1949. But they would win only 25 games more all season, playing at an abysmal .229 rate over their last 109 contests. In today's 162-game schedule, that would have resulted in a 37–125 mark, surpassing the 1962 Mets' record for futility. At year's end, manager Kuhel would be replaced by Bucky Harris, the Senators' 1924 "boy wonder" manager, now 53, returning for a third term as skipper of the Senators.

Offseason 
 October 4, 1948: John Sullivan, Tom Ferrick and $25,000 were traded by the Senators to the St. Louis Browns for Sam Dente.
 Prior to 1949 season: Jim Pearce was signed as a free agent by the Senators.

Regular season 
On September 28, Senators pitcher Ray Scarborough ended Ted Williams' streak of most consecutive games reaching base safely at 84 games. Scarborough gave up just four hits in a 4–1 complete game win over the Boston Red Sox. Johnny Pesky made the final out with Williams on deck.

Season standings

Record vs. opponents

Notable transactions 
 May 24, 1949: Milo Candini was traded by the Senators to the Oakland Oaks for Lloyd Hittle.

Roster

Player stats

Batting

Starters by position 
Note: Pos = Position; G = Games played; AB = At bats; H = Hits; Avg. = Batting average; HR = Home runs; RBI = Runs batted in

Other batters 
Note: G = Games played; AB = At bats; H = Hits; Avg. = Batting average; HR = Home runs; RBI = Runs batted in

Pitching

Starting pitchers 
Note: G = Games pitched; IP = Innings pitched; W = Wins; L = Losses; ERA = Earned run average; SO = Strikeouts

Other pitchers 
Note: G = Games pitched; IP = Innings pitched; W = Wins; L = Losses; ERA = Earned run average; SO = Strikeouts

Relief pitchers 
Note: G = Games pitched; W = Wins; L = Losses; SV = Saves; ERA = Earned run average; SO = Strikeouts

Farm system

References

External links 
1949 Washington Senators at Baseball-Reference
1949 Washington Senators team page at www.baseball-almanac.com

 

Minnesota Twins seasons
Washington Senators season
Washington